Novaya Kalitva is a rural locality (a selo) and the administrative center of Novokalitvenskoye Rural Settlement, Rossoshansky District, Voronezh Oblast, Russia. The population was 2,325 as of 2010. There are 47 streets.

Geography 
Novaya Kalitva is located 42 km southeast of Rossosh (the district's administrative centre) by road. Ivanovka is the nearest rural locality.

References 

Rural localities in Rossoshansky District